The 2009 Ironman 70.3 World Championship was a triathlon competition held in Clearwater, Florida on November 14, 2009. The race was sponsored by Foster Grant and organized by the World Triathlon Corporation. The championship race is the culmination of the Ironman 70.3 series of races that take place during the 12 months prior leading up to the event. Athletes, both professional and amateur, earn a spot in the championship race by qualifying in races throughout the 70.3 series.

Medallists

Men

Women

Qualification
The 2009 Ironman 70.3 Series features 34 events that enable qualification to the 2009 World Championship event. Some 70.3 events also act as qualifiers for the full Ironman World Championships in Hawaii.

Qualifying Ironman 70.3s

2009 Ironman 70.3 Series results

Men

Women

References

External links
Ironman World Championship 70.3 webpage

Ironman World Championship
Ironman
Triathlon competitions in the United States
2009 in American sports
Sports competitions in Florida
2009 in sports in Florida
Sports in Clearwater, Florida